The 1900 Maine gubernatorial election took place on September 10, 1900.

Incumbent Governor Llewellyn Powers did not seek re-election. Republican candidate John Fremont Hill defeated Democratic candidate Samuel L. Lord.

General election

Candidates
Major party candidates
Samuel L. Lord, Democratic, Democratic candidate for Governor in 1898
John Fremont Hill, Republican, former member of the Executive Council of Maine

Other candidates
Grant Rogers, Prohibition
Norman Wallace Lermond, Socialist, Populist candidate for Maine's 2nd congressional district in 1892

Results

References

Gubernatorial
1900
Maine
September 1900 events